Sekong is the capital city of Sekong Province, Sekong District, Laos.

Sekong may also refer to:

Sekong province, province of Laos
Sekong (state constituency), state constituency in Sabah, Malaysia

See also 
 Sejong (disambiguation)